Harry Henry McCurdy (September 15, 1899 – July 21, 1972), born in Stevens Point, Wisconsin, was a catcher for the St. Louis Cardinals (1922–1923), Chicago White Sox (1926–1928), Philadelphia Phillies (1930–1933) and Cincinnati Reds (1934).

In 10 seasons he played in 543 games and had 1,157 at bats, 148 runs, 326 hits, 71 doubles, 12 triples, 9 home runs, 148 RBI, 12 stolen bases, 129 walks, .282 batting average, .355 on-base percentage, .387 slugging percentage, 448 total bases and 25 sacrifice hits.

He died in Houston, Texas at the age of 72.

External links

Chicago White Sox players
Cincinnati Reds players
Philadelphia Phillies players
St. Louis Cardinals players
Brooklyn Dodgers scouts
Major League Baseball catchers
People from Stevens Point, Wisconsin
Baseball players from Wisconsin
Minor league baseball managers
1899 births
1972 deaths